Clarence Archibald Sullivan (5 April 1898 – 30 September 1978) was an Australian rules footballer who played with St Kilda in the Victorian Football League (VFL).

Notes

External links 

1898 births
1978 deaths
Australian rules footballers from Victoria (Australia)
St Kilda Football Club players
Williamstown Football Club players
People from Maryborough, Victoria